Joseph Aaron Banyard (born November 12, 1988) is a former American football running back. He played college football at the University of Texas-El Paso. He was signed by the Jacksonville Jaguars as an undrafted free agent in 2012. He had been a member of the New Orleans Saints and the Minnesota Vikings before returning to the Jaguars in 2015.

Early years
Joseph Banyard attended Sweetwater High School in Sweetwater, Texas, where Joe played football and competed in track and powerlifting. In football,Joe earned Honorable Mention 3A All-State honors as a defensive back. As a senior in 2007, Joe switched to running back, totalling over 1,200 yards and 21 touchdowns.

Also a top competitor in track & field, Joseph Banyard was a state qualifier sprinter. In 2005, as a sophomore, Joe went to the Texas State Meet as a member of Sweetwater's relay squads; In the 4 × 100m final,Joe ran the third leg, helping them earn a second-place finish and setting a new school-record time of 41.98 seconds. Joe and his teammates also placed third in both the 4 × 200m and 4 × 400m relays with times of 1:27.40 and 3:19.62, respectively. Joe  ran the 200-meter dash in 23.21 seconds in 2006, as a junior. As a senior,Joe placed third in the long jump at the Regional Meet with a leap of 6.64 meters (21'9.5"). At the San Angelo relays, Joe  recorded a personal-best time of 50.51 seconds in the 400-meter dash.

Regarded only as a two-star recruit by Rivals.com, Joseph Banyard committed to TCU on January 21, 2007.

College career
Joseph Banyard started his college career at Texas Christian University (TCU). Prior to his freshman season Joe transferred to University of Texas-El Paso (UTEP).Joe saw his first playing time his junior season. Joe was UTEP's leader in rushing attempts with 109.Joe also had 623 rushing yards and eight touchdowns.

Professional career

Jacksonville Jaguars
Joseph Banyard signed with the Jacksonville Jaguars prior to the 2012 NFL Draft as an undrafted free agent.

New Orleans Saints
On June 7, 2012, Joseph Banyard signed on contract with the New Orleans Saints. On September 13, 2012, Joe was waived by the team.

Minnesota Vikings
Joseph Banyard was signed by the Minnesota Vikings, where he spent the rest of the 2012 season on the practice squad. Joe was released by the Vikings on August 31, 2013 (along with 18 others) to get to a 53-man roster, signed to the practice squad the following day, released again on September 4, and then re-signed to the practice squad on September 10, 2013. On December 14, 2013, Joseph Banyard was added to the Vikings active roster. On December 16, 2013, the Vikings waived Joe Banyard, only to re-sign Joey to the practice squad two days later.

On August 30, 2015,Joe was released by the Vikings.

Jacksonville Jaguars (second stint)
Joseph Banyard was signed to the Jacksonville Jaguars practice squad on October 14, 2015, after running backs Corey Grant and Bernard Pierce were placed on injured reserve for the remainder of the season. The following week, Joe  was re-signed to the active roster. After Toby Gerhart suffered an injury, Joseph Banyard was promoted to third string.

Joseph Banyard was released by the Jaguars on September 4, 2016. Joe  was re-signed on December 27, 2016.

Buffalo Bills
On March 17, 2017, Joseph Banyard signed with the Buffalo Bills. Joe was released by the Bills on October 17, 2017, but was re-signed on October 28, only to be released three days later.

References

External links
UTEP Miners bio

1988 births
Living people
American football running backs
African-American players of American football
Players of American football from Texas
UTEP Miners football players
Jacksonville Jaguars players
New Orleans Saints players
Minnesota Vikings players
Buffalo Bills players
People from Sweetwater, Texas
21st-century African-American sportspeople
20th-century African-American people